Universal TV was a British and Irish pay television channel owned by the NBCUniversal International Networks division of NBCUniversal. It was devoted primarily to imported drama series, mostly from the United States.

History
The channel launched in October 1999 and was previously owned by the privately backed Sparrowhawk Media Group, until late 2007 when it was bought out by NBCUniversal. It previously licensed programming and branding from Crown Media Holdings, and was previously known as the Hallmark Entertainment Network and the Hallmark Channel (Crown Media had sold off their international assets in 2005).

Coinciding with the launch of Hallmark Channel HD, Hallmark Channel became 16:9 widescreen capable on 28 June 2010.

As Universal Channel
In June 2009, a memorandum leaked to the television trade newspaper Broadcast stated that NBC Universal planned to rebrand the Hallmark Channel as a Universal Channel in October 2009. The "Hallmark Channel" brand was licensed to NBC Universal from Crown Media (which operates the US Hallmark Channel) and was due to expire. An NBC Universal spokesperson denied such a rebrand would happen.

On 2 September 2010, Universal Networks International confirmed plans to rebrand the Hallmark Channel as the Universal Channel in the UK. On 18 October, the pay-TV channel and its timeshift and high definition variants became the Universal Channel, Universal Channel +1 and Universal Channel HD.

The Universal Channel gave UK premieres to cop show Rookie Blue and legal drama Fairly Legal in early 2011. It also aired Shattered, which stars Callum Keith Rennie as a homicide detective suffering from multiple personality disorder.

On 1 December 2010, Universal Channel launched a specific feed which targets Ireland. Universal Channel in Ireland airs localised advertising. The Irish feed does not include subtitles. TV3 act as the Irish variation's advertising sales agents.

On 31 July 2013, Universal Channel unveiled a refreshed branding and new slogan it launched on 5 August, "100% Characters". The brand reflected "that great characters are the magnets that draw viewers back to their favourite shows - week after week".

As Universal TV 
On 3 May 2018, NBCUniversal unveiled a new name and branding for its Universal Channel chain, Universal TV, launching first on the United Kingdom feed. The rebranding was intended to make the network a "destination brand that celebrates world-class, high-quality, character-driven content".

Closure 
In December 2019, BT TV announced that Universal TV would be leaving the UK market along with VH1 and that the channel will close.

The channel closed down its operations on 27 January 2020, with Sky Comedy taking its place on EPG guides.

Programming
 Acceptable Risk
 Bates Motel
 Burden of Truth
 Chance
 Chicago Justice
 Chicago Med (now on Sky Witness) 
 Condor (now on Sky Max)
 Conviction
 Coroner (now on Sky Witness)
 Departure (now on Sky Witness)
 The Disappearance
 The District
 Fairly Legal
 Gone
 House
 How to Get Away with Murder (now on Sky Witness)
 JAG
 Law & Order: Special Victims Unit (now on Sky Witness)
 Major Crimes (now on Alibi)
 McLeod's Daughters
 Motive
 Mr. Robot
 The Murders
 Private Eyes (now on Sky Witness)
 Proven Innocent
 Pure Genius
 Ransom (now on 5USA)
 The Resident (now on Sky Witness)
 Rookie Blue (now on 5USA)
 Royal Pains
 Sea Patrol
 Second Chance
 Shattered
 Sleepy Hollow
 Teleshopping

Sister and subsidiary channels

Universal TV HD
Universal TV HD, a high-definition simulcast, launched on Sky (as the Hallmark Channel HD) on 28 June 2010 at 7pm. Showing US shows like the Law & Order titles, CSI and Without a Trace in high definition.

Universal TV HD was also launched on BT TV on 1 September 2016.

Hallmark 2
In July 2005, there were rumours that Sparrowhawk were going to launch a sister channel to the Hallmark Channel, called Hallmark 2. This was denied by a spokesperson for Hallmark who said that "a second channel from Hallmark will not be launching 'anytime soon'". Movies 24 was launched instead.

Former logos

See also
 Universal Channel
 Hallmark Channel
 Hallmark Channel (International)

References

External links
 

Universal Networks International
Defunct television channels in the United Kingdom
Television channels and stations established in 1999
Television channels and stations disestablished in 2020
1999 establishments in the United Kingdom
2020 disestablishments in the United Kingdom